The women's shot put event at the 1970 Summer Universiade was held at the Stadio Comunale in Turin in September 1970.

Results

References

Athletics at the 1970 Summer Universiade
1970